PS Norfolk was a passenger vessel built for the Great Eastern Railway in 1900.

History

The ship was built by Gourlay Brothers in Dundee  for the Great Eastern Railway and launched on 25 April 1900.  She was launched by Miss Janie Lyon.  She was built of steel and equipped with a double-ended hull, with two rudders adapted for steaming with equal facility astern or ahead.

She was used on local services and coastal excursions.

In 1923 she passed into the ownership of the London and North Eastern Railway and they sold her in 1931 to D. Tweedie, Edinburgh. She was sent for scrapping in 1935.

References

1900 ships
Steamships of the United Kingdom
Paddle steamers of the United Kingdom
Ships built in Dundee
Ships of the Great Eastern Railway
Ships of the London and North Eastern Railway